Tiddly Wink may refer to:

Tiddlywinks, an indoor game
 Tiddleywink, hamlet in Wiltshire, England
Tiddly Wink (pony), character in the My Little Pony franchise
Tiddly-Wink (domino game), domino game in which playing a double entitles a second play